Call My Name is the tenth extended play by South Korean boy band Got7. It was released through JYP Entertainment on November 4, 2019. It features the lead single "You Calling My Name".

Background 
Following the conclusion of Got7's Keep Spinning World Tour, on October 18, 2019, JYP Entertainment announced a new music release for the group in South Korea, and, after seven short films, on October 24 revealed the title of the record and the release date. The track list was disclosed on October 30. Call My Name, together with the music video of title track "You Calling My Name", was released on November 4, 2019, and was presented to the public with a showcase on the same day.

The record, which Got7 worked on during the Keep Spinning World Tour, ideally serves as a continuation of their previous Korean EP, Spinning Top: while in the latter the group expressed their insecurities, Call My Name tells how hearing the fans call "Got7" calmed their anxiety and led the septet to find its true value by realizing that it can shine on stage. Call My Name has the concept of name (名) as its main theme, and talks about "how, if you don't call my name, I have no reason to exist".The lyrics, overall, mix sadness and pain. The title track "You Calling My Name" sees Got7 adopting a sexy and sorrowful concept for the first time. The lyrics are penned by J.Y. Park and JB, who is also behind "Pray" e "Thursday"; Jinyoung and Yugyeom co-wrote "Run Away" and "Crash & Burn", respectively.
"You Calling My Name", whose genres are funk and R&B, contains the message "you, who called my name while I was trapped in the dark, have become the reason for my existence". The song is dedicated to fans and, expressing thanks and apologies to them, contains the emotions felt during the Keep Spinning World Tour by hearing their cheers.

With "Pray" the group tells the fan it prays for them and that they are its strength. "Thursday" compares the relationship with another person to Thursday, an ambiguous day as, being mid-week, it is neither a weekday nor part of the weekend, and which is therefore used to describe a vague and uncertain relationship. "Run Away" is about wanting to escape the city to go to a better place, while "Crash & Burn" has an energy similar to "Hard Carry".

Critical reception 
The Kraze Magazine defined "You Calling My Name" as "a perfect example of how mature [Got7] have become in sound and style. No longer are they the young boys that are chasing after girls in school, but are grown men going through the motions of deep relationships and heartbreak".

At the end of 2019, "You Calling My Name" ranked sixth in Billboard's "25 Best K-pop Songs of 2019" list, which described it as "captivating and impactful" and noted how it matched the group, making use of each individual members' strengths.

Commercial success 
Call My Name topped Gaon Weekly Album Chart in South Korea upon release, and was second in the Monthly Chart with  copies sold. In January 2020 it was certified platinum. It was the 19th best selling album of 2019 in South Korea with  copies sold.

In the US, it debuted at number 5 on the Billboard World Albums Chart with 1,000 copies sold, and at number 8 on the Heatseekers Albums Chart.

Track listing

Charts

Weekly charts

Year-end charts

Accolades

References

2019 EPs
Got7 EPs
JYP Entertainment EPs
Korean-language EPs